The Brookside Gardens are public gardens located within Wheaton Regional Park, at 1800 Glenallan Avenue, Silver Spring, Maryland. The gardens are open daily without charge. However, certain annual events there are held that may charge a fee. The gardens hosts a "Garden of Lights" exhibit that features a light display during the holiday season.

History
The garden grounds were originally part of a landscaping and garden center on a small farm owned by Stadler Nurseries.

Brookside Gardens opened to the public on July 13, 1969, with a conservatory and  developed as gardens. The landscaping and conservatory were designed by Hans Hanses and Carl Schoening, respectively. More gardens have been added and refined to showcase local species over the current . Hans remarked "the main idea for the garden was to supply the average homeowner with ideas for his own use. Everything you see here is not exotic, but something which grows well in the metropolitan area and which one can buy in any garden center.".

A donation from Elizabeth Turner made possible the construction of a Visitors Center, opening in June 1998, with classroom and meeting space.

Features

 Aquatic Garden – water-loving plants with two ponds and gazebo.
 Azalea Garden – over 300 varieties of azaleas represented by 2,000 plants. Also rhododendrons, witchhazels, hollies, Japanese andromeda, sweet-box, skimmia, and shade-tolerant perennials.
 Butterfly Garden – Seasonal in summer only. Admission fee.
 Children's “School's Outside” Garden
 Conservatories – seasonal displays and special exhibits. The surrounding garden contains a collection of unusual conifers and groundcovers.
Dry Stone Sphere—A stacked stone sculpture, by stone artist Devin Devine.
 Fragrance Garden
 Gude Garden – a Japanese-style landscape with bamboo, beech, unusual conifers, dogwood, and groundcovers, as well as an island teahouse overlooking the ponds.
 Maple Terrace – raised beds within a planting of ‘Suminagashi’ Japanese maples.
 a Japanese teahouse overlooking a pond stocked with koi.
 Perennial Garden – wisterias, roses, Jasmine stephanense, buddleia, and Prunus × cistena, allium, geranium, sedum, panicum, lespedeza, calamagrostis, anemones, asters, acanthus, and agastache, etc.
 Reflection Terrace – a memorial to the ten individuals killed in the October 2002 D.C. sniper attacks.
 Rock Garden – spring flowering bulbs with grasses and conifers.
 Rose Garden – all types of roses, including hybrid tea, rugosa hybrids, grandiflora, English, miniature, floribunda, shrub, groundcover, polyantha, climber, Gallica, hybrid musk, and the garden rose.
 Trial Garden – spring flowering bulbs, then summer displays of new and unusual plant varieties. 
 Woodland Walk – forested wetland with bald cypress, tulip poplar, spicebush, and groundcover of mayapple, fern, and skunk cabbage. A native plant garden includes approximately 124 species and cultivars of Maryland native plants.
 Yew Garden – a garden room within yew hedges.

Gallery

See also 
 List of botanical gardens in the United States

References

External links 

 Brookside Gardens at Montgomery Parks
 Brookside Gardens at DC Gardens

Botanical gardens in Maryland
Nature centers in Maryland
Tourist attractions in Montgomery County, Maryland
Geography of Montgomery County, Maryland
Wheaton, Maryland
Protected areas established in 1969
1969 establishments in Maryland